Nafaanra (sometimes written Nafaara, pronounced ), also known as Nafanan or Nafana, is a Senufo language spoken in northwest Ghana, along the border with Ivory Coast, east of Bondoukou. It is spoken by approximately  people. Its speakers call themselves Nafana, but others call them Banda or Mfantera. Like other Senufo languages, Nafaanra is a tonal language.

The basic word order is subject–object–verb, like Latin and Japanese. Like other Niger–Congo languages, it has a noun class system, with nouns classified according to five different classes, which also affects pronouns, adjectives and copulas. The phonology features a distinction between the length of vowels and whether they are oral or nasal (as in French or Portuguese). There are also three distinct tones, a feature shared with the other Senufo languages. Nafaanra grammar features both tense and aspect which are marked with particles. Numbers are mainly formed by adding cardinal numbers to the number 5 and by multiplying the numbers 10, 20 and 100.

Geography and demography
Nafaanra is bordered by Kulango languages to the west and southeast, while Deg (a Gur language) is found to the north and east. The closest eastern and western neighbour is the Mande language Ligbi. Southeast and south of Nafaanra and Ligbi, the Akan language Abron is spoken.

The Nafana people live in the north-west corner of the Brong-Ahafo Region of Ghana, concentrated mainly in Sampa (capital of the Jaman North district) and Banda. There are two dialectal variants of Nafaanra: Pantera of Banda, and Fantera of Sampa. Bendor-Samuel gives a 79% cognate relationship on the Swadesh list between the two dialects, meaning that they have many basic words in common. The Banda dialect is considered central. The terms "Fantera" and "Pantera" come from other peoples and are considered pejorative by the Nafana.

The Nafana people say that they come from a village called Kakala in Ivory Coast. Their oral history says that some of their people are still there, and if they go back they will not be allowed to leave again. They arrived in the Banda area after the Ligbi people, who came from Begho (Bigu, Bighu) to the area in the early 17th century.

According to Ethnologue, as of 2005, many Nafana are bilingual in Twi, the regional lingua franca, to some extent. Using the ILR scale: 50% of Nafana have limited working proficiency in Twi, while 20% have general professional proficiency The remaining 30% have either elementary proficiency (15%) or no proficiency at all (15%). 15–25% of the Nafana people are literate in Twi, whereas only 1–5% are literate in Nafaanra.

65 Dompo people living in the close vicinity of Banda have shifted to Nafaanra. Dompo is their first language, thought to be extinct until a field work trip of Blench in 1998 proved the contrary.

Classification
Maurice Delafosse was the first linguist to mention Nafaanra, calling it "a much dispersed Senufo tribe" in 1904. Westermann in his classification of West-African languages, also grouped Nafaanra with Senufo, apparently based on the word list found in Rapp. This classification is confirmed by Bendor-Samuel, who bases his internal Senufo classification on the comparative word lists in Swadesh et al.

It is less clear which particular Senufo branch Nafaanra is related to most closely. Bendor-Samuel gives a 60% cognate relationship on the Swadesh list with "Tenere" (a western Senari dialect), 59% with "Central Senari" (the Senari dialect spoken around Korhogo), and 43% with the non-Senufo languages Mo (or Deg), Kabre (or Kabiye), and Dogon. The relatively low scores of about 60% point to a rather distant relationship. Likewise, Mensah and Tchagbale establish an intercomprensibility factor of 38% with "Tyebaara" (Senari), concluding that Nafaanra is only distantly related to this dialect. Nafaanra has been tentatively linked to Palaka (Kpalaga) by Manessy, whereas Mills suggests a relation with the southern Tagwana–Djimini branch.

Sounds

Vowels
Nafaanra has seven oral and five nasalized vowels. The vowel system closely resembles that of other Senufo languages. It is like the two Northern Senufo languages Supyire and Mamara in having only five nasal against seven oral vowels.

Consonants

Tone
Like the other Senufo languages, Nafaanra has three contrastive tones: High, Mid and Low. Tone is normally not marked in the Nafaanra orthography. Examples are:
 kúfɔ̀ "yam" (High-Low)
 dama "two pesewas (coin)" (Mid)
 màŋà "rope" (Low)
The Mid tone sometimes has a rising feature, the High tone sometimes is subject to downstep (a tonal process resulting in a High tone being realised lower than a preceding High tone), and an upstep is also found. The "rising feature" of Mid may be related to the fact that two different Mid tones are found in some other Senufo languages (e.g. Sucite and Supyire). The High tone downstep (signified by a raised exclamation mark) occurs in the following context:

It is likely that the tonal lowering seen in this particular example is related to the low tone nasal prefix found in future tense constructions in some other Senufo languages. In fact, Supyire shows a similar phenomenon in future tense constructions with a direct object (in other future tense constructions, a low tone nasal is found). In general however, downstep is more widespread than in Supyire; a similar phenomenon is found in Palaka, Tagwana, and Djimini.

An upstep is found in the imperative tense of high tone verbs:

Grammar
The Nafaanra syllable comprises a vowel and a maximum of three consonants. A nasal consonant may occur as a syllable on its own, in which case it is called a syllabic nasal. The basic syllable structure can be rendered as (C1)(C2)V(C3), with a preference for CV and CVV. Position C1 may contain any consonant, although word-initial /r/ does not occur. Position C2 may contain only trills (/r/) or approximants (/w, l, j/). Position C3 may contain only nasals, in which case the syllable as a whole is nasalized.

Senufo languages have a typical Niger–Congo noun class (or gender) system. Suffixes on nouns mark membership of one of the five noun genders. Pronouns, adjectives and copulas reflect the noun gender of the nominal they refer to. Although none of the sources on Nafaanra provides any details, it can be inferred from a brief word list given by Jordan 

The basic word order in Nafaanra is subject–object–verb, as can be seen in the following sentence:

Personal pronouns
Jordan lists the following list of pronouns, commenting, "Although the pronoun system appears quite simple, it becomes complicated because all the tenses are shown by a combination of pronoun plus particle."

Tense and aspect
Tense and aspect in Nafaanra are generally encoded in two places: in preverbal particles and on the verb form. Nafaanra has past, recent past, and future tenses and continuative aspect. In a simple sentence, the order of the various constituents can be rendered as follows:  SUBJECT • (NEGATION) • (TENSE) • (ASPECT) • VERB . When the negative suffix -n is present, no fusing of preverbal particles takes place. Nafaanra additionally expresses some tense/aspect matters by use of certain time adverbs and auxiliary verbs.

Past tense is marked by the preverbal particle ná (high tone, as opposed to the low tone continuative particle). Future tense is marked by the particle wè. Simple sentences without a preverbal tense particle are interpreted as recent past (sometimes called immediate). If aspect marking is absent, simple sentences are generally interpreted as completive.

Continuative aspect (sometimes called progressive) denotes an action that is ongoing or repetitive. Continuative aspect is usually marked both by a preverbal particle nà (low tone) and by a change of the verb form. The verb sɛ́, "go" used in the sentences below has the continuative form síé. In sentences where both past tense particle ná and continuative particle nà are present, they combine to give the fused particle náà. In sentences in the recent past tense, the preverbal continuative particle is omitted and continuative aspect is shown only on the verb.

Two classes of verbs can be differentiated on the basis of their behaviour in aspectually marked sentences.

Questions
Questions can be formed in several ways in Nafaanra. Basic yes–no questions are constructed by adding a sentence-final question marker rá. Constituent questions (sometimes called Wh-questions or question word questions) are doubly marked. They contain a sentence-initial question word and are marked with a sentence-final question marker hin.

Numbers
The cardinal numbers without tonal marking are presented below; where possible, the tone pattern is added based on the list in Rapp. 

Rapp (1933) compares the Nafaanra numerals for three (táárɛ) and hundred (lafaa) with eta and ke-lafa from Mpre, a hitherto unclassified language from Ghana. The Mpre eta is Kwa-like (cf. Brong esã, Ga etɛ), whereas the Nafaanra form táárɛ is transparently related to the forms found in the other (non-Kwa) Senufo languages (e.g. Supyire tàànrè).  Nafaanra lafaa "hundred" is a typical Kwa numeral and is most probably borrowed from one of the surrounding Kwa languages (cf. Dangme làfá, Gonja kì-làfá, Ewe alafá). Rapp's implication of affinity between Mpre and Nafaanra seems therefore unwarranted at this level.

Colour words
There are 3 to 4 basic colors in Nafanan. 
 wɔɔ—ki wɔ   "it is black"
 finge—ki finge   "it is white"
 ɲiɛ—ki ɲina   "it is red"
The cognate forms in closely related Supyire are -ɲyɛ-, "red; warm colored", and -fyìn-, "white; light colored", in Supyire. These adjectives are related to the respective verbs fíníŋɛ́, "be white; whiten" and ɲááŋá, "be red; redden", which in turn are causative forms of the now defunct verbs fini,"be white" and ɲana, "be red".

Sample sentences
Sample Nafaanra sentences from the SIL:

Research

There is relatively little published on or in the Nafaanra language. The first linguistic publication to mention Nafaanra is Delafosse (1904), containing some notes on the Nafana people and a fairly extensive comparative Senufo word list, though it lacked any proper tonal marking. Rapp (1933) is an appendix to an article on the Kulango language containing a German-Nafaanra (Nafana-Sprache) word list of around 100 items, gathered during a stay of four hours at Sampa. Rapp notes in passing that special attention was paid to the marking of the tones.

After a period of silence on Nafaanra, Painter (1966) appeared, consisting of basic word lists of the Pantera and Fantera dialects. The SIL linguist Dean Jordan published an article on Nafaanra discourse in 1978, and together with his wife Carol Jordan has produced a translation of the New Testament, which appeared in 1984. The whole bible was translated in 2015. Kropp-Dakubu's 1980 West African language data sheets vol II contains a few pages on Nafaanra put together in the late seventies by Dean and Carol Jordan, including a phonology, a list of nouns, a list of pronouns, a list of numbers, and some example sentences; tones are not marked. A more detailed phonology of Nafaanra by Jordan, also containing a Swadesh list, appeared in 1980.  Mensah and Tchagbale in their 1983 linguistic atlas of Ivory Coast include a comparative Senufo word list of about 120 items; Nafaanra is present under the name "Nafara of Bondoukou". Hartell published an orthography of Nafaanra, lacking tonal marking, in 1993. The area where Nafaanra is spoken has been the subject of recent archaeological-anthropological studies.

Notes

References

Sources

Primary sources 
 
 International Bible Society (1984): Nyiɛkpɔɔ nyu nunu fɔŋgɔ.
 
 
 
 Painter, Colin (1966) Word lists of two Senufo dialects: Fantera et Pantera. Legon: University of Ghana. (30p)

Secondary sources

Further reading
Brɔfu ni yuu (a bridge material to English) Nafaanra. Ghana Institute of Linguistics, Literacy and Bible Translation (1994)
Nafaanra dictionary (PDF), by Dean Jordan of SIL.

Senufo languages
Languages of Ghana